William M. Flynn (born February 3, 1938) is an American politician who served in the New Jersey General Assembly from 1974 to 1986. He had also served as mayor of Old Bridge Township.

He is married to Elaine Flynn, the Middlesex County Clerk.

References

External links

|-

1938 births
Living people
Democratic Party members of the New Jersey General Assembly
Mayors of places in New Jersey
Politicians from Middlesex County, New Jersey
People from Old Bridge Township, New Jersey
People from Perth Amboy, New Jersey